Union County Public Schools may refer to:

 Union County Public Schools of Union County, Kentucky
 Union County Public Schools of Union County, North Carolina
 Union County Public Schools of Union County, Tennessee